A pom-pom is a loose, fluffy, decorative ball or tuft of fibrous material, most often seen shaken by cheerleaders or worn atop a hat.

Pom-pom, pompom, pom pom, pom-pon or pompon may also refer to:

People 
 François Pompon (1856–1933), French sculptor
 Bob Whiting (1883–1917), English footballer known as Pom Pom Whiting

Fictional characters 
 Pom Pom, a fictional character from Super Mario 3D Land
 Pom Pom, a character in the Flash animated cartoon Homestar Runner

Military 
 QF 1 pounder pom-pom, an infantry gun of the Second Boer War
 QF 2 pounder naval gun, a British anti-aircraft gun in naval use
Pom-Pom director, a fire-director for QF 2 pounder naval gun
 , a U.S. Navy submarine built during World War II

Biology 
 Hericium erinaceus, known as the pom pom mushroom
 Pompon, the fish Anisotremus surinamensis, inspiration for the name of the submarine
Eupatorium macrocephalum, aka Pompom Weed

Entertainment 
 PomPom Games, an independent game developer
 Pom Pom (film), the English language title of a 1984 Hong Kong film (see Lucky Stars#Pom Pom)
 Pom Pom and Friends, an animated television series from 2011–12

Music 
 "Pom Poms" (song), a song by the Jonas Brothers
 pom pom (album), an album by Ariel Pink
 Pom Pom: The Essential Cibo Matto, an album by Cibo Matto
 Pom Pom Squad, an indie rock band
 The Pom-Poms, a project of Kitty and Sam Ray

Others 
 Pom Poms, a candy made by the James O. Welch Co.
 Pom Pom Island, a coral reef island in Malaysia